A product naming convention is a process of product or good description or titling.  Consistent use of alphanumeric characters and separating devices defines a naming convention.  The naming convention will create an identifier for that version or model of product or goods. 

The use of UPC codes may come to replace the need for such naming conventions as bar code readers become common. Speakable product name codes or strict names are still needed for marketing and customer service aspects.  A properly identified product can lead to sales and properly targeted support.

Naming can be separated by a shift of characters.  Heritage concepts like character segments are common.

Examples
Simple names
1234H67
HGrD
11-2044
RR-1234

Complex names
ABC-04-DEF-GHI
AB035NN5T
21T-4000-97

Example-A:
1a-001a-01a
|........|.......|_ (V6-Motor + Carburettor + Brass needle and seats)
|........|_ (V6-Motor + Carburettor) – a 3-digit number (001) for motor type allows for the use of multiple motors types
|  (Vehicle type model-1) (Hatchback)

Example-B:
1 = (A Vehicle type model) 
1a = (Vehicle type model-a) (Hatchback)
1b = (Vehicle type model-b) (Sedan)
.....-001a = (V6-Motor + Carburettor) – a 3-digit number (001) for motor type allows for the use of multiple motors types
.....-001b = (V6-Motor + Carburettor)
.....-001c = (V6-Motor + Fuel injection)
.....-002a = (V8-Motor + Carburettor)
.....-002b = (V8-Motor + Carburettor)
.....-002c = (V8-Motor + Fuel injection)
..............-01a (V6-Motor + Carburettor + Brass needle and seats)
..............-01b (V6-Motor + Carburettor + Stainless steel needle and seats)

See also
 Naming convention
 Naming firms
 Universal Product Code
 Product naming

References

Product management
Brand management
Naming conventions
Goods (economics)